"The Mind's Eye" is the 98th episode of the American syndicated science fiction television series Star Trek: The Next Generation, the 24th episode of the fourth season. David Livingston made his directoral debut at the helm of this episode.

Set in the 24th century, the series follows the adventures of the Starfleet crew of the Federation starship Enterprise-D. In this episode, Geordi La Forge sets out for a vacation on Risa, but his shuttle is apprehended by Romulans who hope to use him in a plot to drive a wedge between the Federation and its Klingon allies. La Forge returns to the Enterprise with no memory of the encounter- nor of the fact that he's just been exposed to days of mind control techniques that have turned him into the perfect assassin.

This episode is a remake of the 1962 movie The Manchurian Candidate, with Levar Burton (Geordi) in the Laurence Harvey role, Romulans in the Khigh Dhiegh (best known as the villainous Wo Fat in Hawaii Five-O) role, and a Klingon in the Angela Lansbury role.  Director David Livingston was an admirer of the movie, and had hope to include a cast member from the movie as an extra, but was unable to do so.  Instead, Livingston introduced an homage shot in the scene where a brain-washed La Forge kills a holodeck version of O'Brien.

Plot 
Chief Engineer Geordi La Forge of the Federation starship Enterprise, en route to the planet Risa for shore leave in a shuttlecraft, is captured by Romulans. While an impostor that looks like La Forge is sent to Risa, the Romulans strap La Forge to a chair restraining his head, and his arms with a visual, tapping device to tap into La Forge's visual cortex via his visor sensors, giving them a limited form of mind control over him. After several days, La Forge's mind is wiped of his capture but given memories of going to Risa, and put back aboard his shuttle, to return to the Enterprise. He arrives as the Enterprise crew are working with the Klingon Ambassador Kell to deal with rebels attacking the outlying Krios colony. The Governor of the colony, Vagh, asserts that the rebellion is being aided by the Federation, thus requiring the Federation's presence to resolve.

At the colony, Vagh shows Captain Picard and Kell several Federation weapons and medical supplies taken from the rebels. Picard orders his crew to investigate. Lt. Commander Data finds that strange E-band radiation is nearby but cannot detect the source. He and La Forge also discover the apparent Federation weapons were replicated using Romulan technology and powered by Romulan energy cells. Later, under the direction of his controllers, La Forge unknowingly transports a case of Federation weapons from the Enterprise to the rebel base, and then subsequently erases the logs. Vagh, monitoring the transport, immediately accuses the Enterprise of its deception. Data and La Forge review the transport logs but find no evidence for the transport even though the weapons originated from the Enterprise, and realize that only they themselves and two other crewmembers could have falsified the logs in that manner. Again, outside of his control, La Forge enters Kell's quarters on the Enterprise, where it is revealed that Kell was controlling La Forge. Kell orders La Forge to assassinate Vagh in a public setting before witnesses in such a manner as to utterly convince Vagh's people of Federation involvement.

At Kell's suggestion, Picard invites Vagh to come aboard the Enterprise to witness the transport logs firsthand. As Picard takes Vagh around the ship, Data comes to learn that the E-band radiation is coming from aboard the Enterprise and that La Forge never made it to Risa. He orders Security Chief Worf to immediately detain La Forge. The assassination attempt is blocked, and Data arrives to explain the situation, saying that the limited transmission range means the device controlling La Forge must either be in Picard's or Kell's possession. Kell refuses to undergo a search, but Vagh offers to take him to the colony to do so there. Fearing the consequences of being investigated by his own people, Kell quickly requests asylum aboard the Enterprise, which Picard says they will consider after his name is cleared of any wrongdoing by the Klingons. Kell is taken away by Vagh's guards. La Forge is cleared but struggles to understand what happened to him.

Notes
 This is the first episode to feature former cast member Denise Crosby in a role other than that of Lt. Tasha Yar, this time portraying the Romulan Commander Sela. In this appearance she is heard but not  clearly seen, foreshadowing the character's appearance in the forthcoming "Redemption" episodes. She previously appeared as Tasha Yar in an alternate reality in the Season 3 episode "Yesterday's Enterprise".

Reception 
In 2012, Wired magazine said this is one of the best episodes of Star Trek: The Next Generation.

In 2017, Vulture.com listed this episode as one of the best of Star Trek: The Next Generation.

Home video 
This episode was released in the United States on September 3, 2002, as part of the Star Trek: The Next Generation season four DVD box set.

CBS announced on September 28, 2011, in celebration of the series' twenty-fifth anniversary, that Star Trek: The Next Generation would be completely re-mastered in 1080p high definition from the original 35mm film negatives. For the remaster almost 25,000 reels of original film stock were rescanned and reedited, and all visual effects were digitally recomposed from original large-format negatives and newly created CGI shots. The release was accompanied by 7.1 DTS Master Audio. On July 30, 2013 "The Minds Eye" was released on 1080p high definition as part of the Season 4 Blu-ray box set in the United States. The set was released on July 29, 2013, in the United Kingdom.

References

 Star Trek The Next Generation DVD set, volume 4, disc 6, selection 4

External links

 
 "The Mind's Eye" rewatch by Keith R. A. DeCandido

Star Trek: The Next Generation (season 4) episodes
1991 American television episodes
Fiction about mind control
Television episodes directed by David Livingston